In number theory, a Smith number is a composite number for which, in a given number base, the sum of its digits is equal to the sum of the digits in its prime factorization in the given number base. In the case of numbers that are not square-free, the factorization is written without exponents, writing the repeated factor as many times as needed. 

Smith numbers were named by Albert Wilansky of Lehigh University, as he noticed the property in the phone number (493-7775) of his brother-in-law Harold Smith:
 4937775 = 31 · 52 · 658371
while 
 4 + 9 + 3 + 7 + 7 + 7 + 5 = 3 · 1 + 5 · 2 + (6 + 5 + 8 + 3 + 7) · 1 = 42
in base 10.

Mathematical definition
Let  be a natural number. A natural number  has the prime factorisation
 
and is a Smith number if
 

For example, in base 10, 378 = 21 · 33 · 71 is a Smith number since 3 + 7 + 8 = 2 · 1 + 3 · 3 + 7 · 1, and 22 = 21 · 111 is a Smith number, because 2 + 2 = 2 · 1 + (1 + 1) · 1.

The first few Smith numbers in base 10 are:
4, 22, 27, 58, 85, 94, 121, 166, 202, 265, 274, 319, 346, 355, 378, 382, 391, 438, 454, 483, 517, 526, 535, 562, 576, 588, 627, 634, 636, 645, 648, 654, 663, 666, 690, 706, 728, 729, 762, 778, 825, 852, 861, 895, 913, 915, 922, 958, 985, 1086 …

Properties 
W.L. McDaniel in 1987 proved that there are infinitely many Smith numbers.
The number of Smith numbers in base 10 below 10n for n = 1, 2, ... is:
 1, 6, 49, 376, 3294, 29928, 278411, 2632758, 25154060, 241882509, … 

Two consecutive Smith numbers (for example, 728 and 729, or 2964 and 2965) are called Smith brothers.  It is not known how many Smith brothers there are. The starting elements of the smallest Smith n-tuple (meaning n consecutive Smith numbers) in base 10 for n = 1, 2, ... are:
 4, 728, 73615, 4463535, 15966114, 2050918644, 164736913905, … 

Smith numbers can be constructed from factored repunits. The largest known Smith number in base 10  is:
9 × R1031 × (104594 + 3 + 1)1476 
where R1031 is the base 10 repunit (101031 − 1)/9.

See also
 Equidigital number

Notes

References

External links
 
 Shyam Sunder Gupta, Fascinating Smith numbers.
 

Base-dependent integer sequences
Lehigh University